Fish River may refer to:

Watercourses

Africa
 Fish River (Namibia)

Australia
 Fish River (Northern Territory), a tributary of the Daly River, located in the Northern Territory
 Fish River (Oberon), a tributary of the Macquarie River, located near Oberon, New South Wales
 Fish River (Gunning), a river near Gunning, New South Wales

New Zealand
 Fish River (New Zealand), a tributary of the Makarora River in the Otago Region

United States
 Fish River (Alabama)
 Fish River (Alaska)
 Fish River (Maine)
 Fish River chain of lakes, in Maine

Places
 Fish River railway station, a station on the Main Southern railway line, New South Wales, Australia, 1875–1975

See also 
 Great Fish River, in South Africa
 Back River (Nunavut), in Nunavut, Canada, also known as "Thlewechodyeth", or "Great Fish River"
 Fish River Canyon
 Fisher River (disambiguation)
 Fishing Creek (disambiguation)